Karl-Heinz Wiesemann (born 1 August 1960) is the 96th Bishop of Speyer.

Life 
Wiesemann was born in Herford, North Rhine-Westphalia in the archdiocese of Paderborn. He became a chaplain on 10 October 1985 in Rome. He later served as a priest in Bösperde, a suburb of Menden and provost of St. Petrus and Andreas in Brilon.

In 2002 Pope John Paul II named him Auxiliary bishop, to which he was ordained on 8 September 2002 in Paderborn Cathedral.

On 19 December 2007 Pope Benedict XVI named him the successor to bishop Anton Schlembach. He was installed to the office on 2 March 2008 in Speyer Cathedral.

Positions 
In January 2014, Wiesemann supported married priests in Roman-Catholic Church.In February 2022, Wiesemann supported blessings of same-sex marriages.

References

External links
 Bischof Dr. Karl-Heinz Wiesemann, Bistum Speyer, (German)

1960 births
Living people
People from Herford
Roman Catholic bishops of Speyer
21st-century German Roman Catholic bishops
21st-century Roman Catholic bishops in Germany